Duchess of Westminster is a title given to the wife of the Duke of Westminster, an extant title in the peerage of the United Kingdom which was created in 1874. Upon the marriage of her son, the incumbent, Natalia, will assume the style of "Her Grace Natalia, Duchess of Westminster" or "Her Grace The Dowager Duchess of Westminster."

Duchesses of Westminster

References

Duchesses of Westminster